Percy Lake is a lake of Ontario, Canada, located west of the southern portion of Algonquin Park in the municipality of Dysart et al, Ontario in Haliburton County. It is located to the east of Haliburton Lake. Several cottages have been built on the northern shore of Percy Lake, and much of its southern portion is only accessible by water. Between the northern shore, and the southern shore of Percy Lake, are the "Narrows". The narrows is a narrow opening to the northern, and southern part of the lake.

See also
List of lakes in Ontario
Haliburton, Ontario

References
 National Resources Canada

Lakes of Haliburton County